The Estonian Music Awards are the annual Estonian pop music awards. The awards began in 1998, when the Estonian Association of the Phonogram Producers first awarded the Golden Record to the most successful artists. The award ceremony was pre-recorded by Eesti Televisioon on 29 December 1998 and aired two days later in the last day of the year.

Categories

Debut Album of the Year
Female Artist of the Year
Male Artist of the Year
Ensemble of the Year
Classic Album of the Year
Jazz Album of the Year
Ethno/Folk Album of the Year
Electronic Music Album of the Year
Alternative/Indie Album of the Year
Metal Album of the Year
Hip-Hop/Rap/RnB Album of the Year
Rock Album of the Year
Pop Album of the Year
Music Video of the Year
Best Song of the Year
Album of the Year
Contribution to Estonia Music

Ceremonies

Table summary

References

External links
Official website 

Estonian music awards
Annual events in Estonia
1998 establishments in Estonia